Donald Kenneth Newman, OC (born 28 October 1940) is a retired senior parliamentary editor for CBC Television who also hosted CBC Newsworld's daily politics program CBC News: Politics. Newman is known for his signature introductory phrase to the viewer "Welcome to the Broadcast", in which he enunciates the first syllable of the last word more slowly than the rest of the greeting. The phrase became the title of his memoir, published in 2013.

Career
Born in Winnipeg, Manitoba, Newman began his career at CTV where he served as the network’s Washington correspondent from 1972 until 1976. In 1976, he moved to CBC and remained in Washington until 1979. He served two years as the Edmonton correspondent before moving to the parliamentary bureau in 1981. From 1981 to 1993, he was the host of CBC’s This Week in Parliament. In 1989, he began to host the daily Capital Report on the new Newsworld channel.

He anchored major political events that affected Canadians on CBC Newsworld. Some of them include:
Canadian federal elections
Leadership conventions
Opening of a new session of Parliament
Visits by world leaders, notably, American presidents
During George W. Bush's visit to Canada in 2004, Newman appeared on MSNBC
Elections in the United States, including U.S. presidential elections
State of the Union addresses by American presidents
State funeral of former U.S. president Ronald Reagan
During the coverage of the state funeral, Newman got expert help in the commentary from former ambassador Allan Gotlieb, Canadian ambassador to Washington in Reagan's day
U.S. presidential inaugurations

During major political events in the United States, he anchored coverage of it from the Canadian Embassy in Washington. The only events he did not anchor from Washington were the State of the Union addresses and the state funeral of Reagan. He anchored coverage of both those events from the CBC Ottawa bureau, where his daily politics program is based.

In 1998, Newman became the first recipient of the Charles Lynch Award for his outstanding coverage of national issues. In 1999, he was made a Member of the Order of Canada. On 14 September 2007, at a special convocation honoring the 40th Anniversary of his alma mater, the University of Winnipeg conferred on him an Honorary Doctor of Laws degree.

On 2 May 2009, Newman's retirement from CBC was announced.

Don Newman made his final "Politics" broadcast on 19 June 2009 and retired at the end of June 2009. Newman stated that he would occasionally write cbc.ca articles, and file reports on TV. He returned to CBC (briefly) for the 2011 federal election coverage.

He was a founder of the Science Media Centre of Canada.

Publications
Welcome to the Broadcast: a Memoir was published in 2013 by HarperCollins.

References

External links
CBC biography
Website for Don Newman's Politics, with online archives for episodes from the past seven days
 CBC icon Don Newman to retire. The Globe and Mail, retrieved 3 May 2009.

1940 births
Canadian television news anchors
Living people
Journalists from Manitoba
Officers of the Order of Canada
People from Winnipeg
Canadian political journalists
20th-century Canadian journalists
21st-century Canadian journalists
Canadian Screen Award winning journalists